Perspectives on Science is a peer-reviewed academic journal that publishes contributions to science studies that integrate historical, philosophical, and sociological perspectives. The journal contains theoretical essays, case studies, and review essays. Perspectives on Science was established in 1993 and is published online and in hard copy by the MIT Press.

Abstracting and indexing
The journal is abstracted and indexed by the following bibliographic databases:

References

External links 
 

History of science journals
MIT Press academic journals
English-language journals
Publications established in 1993
Quarterly journals
Philosophy of science journals